Babacar was a short-lived rock supergroup formed in England, featuring former members of Shelleyan Orphan, The Cure, and Presence. The group released one album in their brief existence, their self-titled debut album in 1998, before the band dissolved when Shelleyan Orphan reunited in 2000.

History
Before forming Babacar in the late 1990s, vocalist Caroline Crawley sang in Shelleyan Orphan until their breakup in 1993, while guitarist Rob Steen and bassist Roberto Soave played together in Presence and drummer Boris Williams (Crawley's then-boyfriend) played for almost a decade with The Cure. Soave and Williams also played together on Shelleyan Orphan's third album Humroot and performed live together with The Cure when Soave was asked to fill in for Simon Gallup when he fell ill during the European leg of the Wish tour, Soave filled in for him on bass. Although Jemaur Tayle, the other half of Orphan, later joined in, he did not participate in the recording of the group's sole album.

Members
Caroline Crawley - vocals
Roberto Soave   - bass guitar
Rob Steen - guitar
Jemaur Tayle - guitar
Boris Williams - drums

Special guests/additional personnel
Porl Thompson - guitar, banjo
Bruno Ellingham - violin
Tristan Powell - e-bow

Discography

Albums
Babacar (1998)

Singles
"Midsummer"

B-sides
"Butterfly"
"Celtic Air"

Notes and references

English rock music groups
British supergroups
Rock music supergroups
Worldbeat groups
World fusion groups